Babs McMillan  (born 27 November 1955) is an Australian stage, film, television actress and director and teacher, based in Melbourne She is best known for her roles in two popular television series during the 1980s.

Career 
McMillan played the acerbic Sister Erin Cosgrove during the final year of television series The Young Doctors and dimwitted country bumpkin Cass Parker in Prisoner. In the late 1990s, she appeared in the Australian espionage drama Secrets.

McMillan has appeared in the movies Oscar and Lucinda (1997), Babe: Pig in the City (1998), My Brilliant Career (1979) and Hating Alison Ashley (2005).

On stage McMillan has acted extensively with the Melbourne Theatre Company. Apart from acting, McMillan has helped many students as Director of Drama at the National Theatre Drama School in Melbourne.

Filmography

Film

Television

References

External links
 

Australian film actresses
Australian soap opera actresses
Australian stage actresses
Living people
20th-century Australian actresses
21st-century Australian actresses
1955 births